Lavette or LaVette is a surname. Notable people with the surname include:

 Bettye LaVette (born 1946), American singer-songwriter
 Robert Lavette (born 1963), American football player

See also
 Lanette
 Lavett, surname